Justin Prinstein (born February 4, 1984) is an American professional baseball player who played in the inaugural Israel Baseball League in 2007.

Prinstein was born in Detroit, Michigan. He played Division 1 baseball at George Washington University and  continued in his professional career in Belgium, Israel, Australia and the Netherlands. In 2007, he pitched a no-hitter in his first professional start in Belgium and then moved on to the inaugural season of the Israel Baseball League, the first-ever pro baseball league in the Middle East, while pitching for the Netanya Tigers in Israel. He was named to the North All-Star team as a pitcher, and ended up hitting .318 as a designated hitter during the 2nd half of the season.

Prinstein, known as Boomer to teammates, played winter ball in Adelaide, Australia for Southern Districts in the South Australia Baseball League, where he was a team-mate of Adam Crabb, a fellow IBL All-Star for Tel Aviv Lightning in 2007.

In 2008 he pitched for the Tex Town Tigers in the Dutch First Division. The following season, in 2009, Prinstein signed as starting pitcher for Almere'90, more commonly known as the Almere Magpies, in the Netherlands. The team won promotion following a five-game final, with Prinstein getting the win in relief of Game 5. In 2010 he returned to the Magpies to pitch in the Hoofdklasse.

Prinstein transferred to the HSV Stealers of Hamburg, Germany, in the German Bundesliga for the last two weekends of the 2010 season (2 starts, 1-1 W/L), helping the club reach the playoffs, where he was ineligible to pitch due to the late transfer. He returned to Hamburg the following summer, but was released after the first half of the season.

In the  2009/2010 winter months, Prinstein pitched for the West Stirling Indians in the Western Australian state league competition, with stats of 11 starts, 9 losses, 1 win and 1 no decision.

In addition to his playing career, Prinstein has coached with the Hungarian national team since 2011. In 2012, he became head coach, and was a Coach of the Year finalist in the European Baseball Coaches Association voting. Connected to his work in Hungary, he has supported the Janossomorja Rascals of the Hungarian league as a coach and player, helping them to multiple Hungarian League final appearances and Hungarian Cup championships between 2010 and 2013.

Prinstein was head coach and a starting pitcher of Hrosi Brno in the Czech Extraliga in 2013.

Prinstein has worked as an MLB scout for multiple clubs in Europe, and is currently an international scout for the Baltimore Orioles since 2013.

Prinstein is an alumnus of University of Detroit Law School, and a relative of former Olympic gold medalist track and field athlete  Myer Prinstein.

References

1984 births
Living people
Columbian College of Arts and Sciences alumni
University of Detroit Mercy alumni
Baseball players from Michigan
Almere Magpies players
Baltimore Orioles scouts
Baseball pitchers